was a 20th-century Japanese commercial artist and woodblock printmaker. He was a prolific artist of the sōsaku-hanga style. He was one of four artists who co-founded the print publishing company Koryokusha. He was noted for his prints of Japanese cultural traditions, flowers, landscapes, and wildlife.

Biography 
Kotozuka was born in Osaka in 1906. He was a member of the Seiryusha Group of Liberal Artists.

Artistic style 
Kotozuka was an adherent of the sosaku hanga style of illustration, which emphasized a print process with greater direct artist involvement, resulting in a somewhat more crude illustration, but one with stronger emotional impact. Prior to sosaku hanga, an artist would create an illustration which would be passed to a team of engravers, printers, and publishers who would each control the production of the final print. In sosaku hanga, the artist was directly involved with each step.

References

Bibliography 
 Helen Merritt and Nanako Yamada, "Guide to Modern Japanese Woodblock Prints: 1900–1975", published by University of Hawaii Press, Honolulu, .
 J. P. Filedt Kok and Jan Frederik Heijbroek, "The Age of Yoshitoshi: Japanese Prints from the Meiji and Taishō Periods : Nagasaki, Yokohama and Kamigata Prints", published by Rijksprentenkabinet/Rijksmuseum

1906 births
1979 deaths
Japanese printmakers
Ukiyo-e artists
Shin hanga artists
20th-century Japanese painters
20th-century printmakers